The 2006-07 Rugby-Bundesliga was the 36th edition of this competition and the 87th edition of the German rugby union championship. The season went from 26 August 2006 to 12 May 2007, ending with the championship final.

Overview
In the 2006-07 season, eight teams played a home-and-away season with a final between the top two teams at the end, which was won by the RG Heidelberg, earning the club a fourth national championship.

The regular season winner SC 1880 Frankfurt lost the final to Heidelberg, which was played in Frankfurt am Main. Frankfurt had been newly promoted to the league. It was only the second time in the history of the German championship that no club from Hannover played in the final.

Last placed DSV 78/08 Ricklingen was relegated to the 2nd Rugby-Bundesliga while the RK Heusenstamm was promoted as the 2nd Bundesliga champions, having beaten SC Germania List in the final.

Bundesliga table

Relegated: DSV 78/08 Ricklingen
Promoted: RK Heusenstamm

Bundesliga results

Results table

Key

Round 1

Round 2

Round 3

Round 4

Round 5

Round 6

Round 7

Round 8

Round 9

Round 10

Round 11

Round 12

Round 13

Round 14

Promotion/relegation play-off

2nd Bundesliga final

Final

2nd Bundesliga tables

South/West

Promoted to Bundesliga: RK Heusenstamm
Relegated from Bundesliga: none
Relegated from 2nd Bundesliga: RC Aachen, RU Marburg
Promoted to 2nd Bundesliga: Stuttgarter RC, RC Mainz

North/East

Promoted to Bundesliga: none
Relegated from Bundesliga: DSV 78/08 Ricklingen
Relegated from 2nd Bundesliga: Stahl Brandenburg Rugby
Promoted to 2nd Bundesliga: Berliner SV 92 Rugby

References

External links
 rugbyweb.de - Rugby-Bundesliga table & results  
 Rugby-Journal - Bundesliga table & results  
 Totalrugby.de - Bundesliga table & results 

2006-07
2006–07 in German rugby union
Gernany